Unreal Estate may refer to:

 Unreal Estate (TV series), an Australian television series
Unreal Estate (Entombed album), an album by Swedish death metal band Entomed
 "Unreal Estate", an episode from the 10th season of SpongeBob SquarePants
 Unreal Estate: Money, Ambition and the Lust for Land in Los Angeles, a 2011 book by Michael Gross

See also 

 Real Estate (disambiguation)